Polydesma boarmoides is a species of moth in the family Erebidae. It was first described by Achille Guenée in 1852. The species is found from the Indo-Australian tropics east from Sri Lanka, to Australia, Fiji and New Caledonia. It has also been recorded from the Marianas, Carolines, Society Islands and Hawaii.

The larvae, characterized by D. G. Sevastopulo for the "dark brown head with a pale, inverted V-mark", feed on the bark and foliage of Acacia, Albizia and Pithecellobium species. The body of the moth has a creamy ground liberally mottled with streaks and dots of both dark and pale brown.

Pupation takes place in a cocoon made of white silk resembling paper.

References

External links

Pandesmini
Moths of Asia
Moths of Japan